The Crime Survey for England and Wales (previously called the British Crime Survey) is a systematic victim study, currently carried out by Kantar Public (formally known as BMRB Ltd) on behalf of the Office for National Statistics (ONS).  Curated by the UK Data Service, it can be accessed for research on their website: https://ukdataservice.ac.uk. The survey seeks to measure the amount of crime in England and Wales by asking around 50,000 people aged 16 and over (as of January 2009), living in private households, about the crimes they have experienced in the last year. From January 2009, 4,000 interviews were also conducted each year with children 10–15 years old, although the resulting statistics remain experimental. The survey is comparable to the National Crime Victimization Survey conducted in the United States.

Initially the survey covered England, Wales and Scotland and was called the British Crime Survey but now the survey is restricted to England and Wales. The Scottish Government has commissioned a bespoke survey of victimisation in Scotland called the Scottish Crime and Victimisation Survey (SCVS).  As a result of this, the British Crime Survey was renamed the Crime Survey for England and Wales to reflect this. The British Crime Survey had been first carried out in 1982 and further surveys were carried out in 1984, 1988, 1992, 1994, 1996, 1998, 2000 and 2001. Since April 2001, BCS interviews had been carried out on a continuous basis and detailed results from that point are now reported by financial years. Headline measures are updated quarterly based on interviews conducted in the previous 12 months.

Since 1994 there has been a separate Northern Ireland Crime Survey, on a biennial basis from 2001, and continuously from January 2005. It is produced by the Statistics and Research Branch of the NIO. It is broadly comparable to the BCS in England and Wales.

The Home Office asserts that the Crime Survey for England and Wales can provide a better reflection of the true level of crime than police statistics since it includes crimes that have not been reported to, or recorded by, the police. For example, due to widespread no criming, over one third of reports of violent crimes are not recorded by police. The Home Office also claims that it measures crime more accurately than police statistics since it captures crimes that people may not bother to report because they think the crime was too trivial or the police could not do much about it. It also provides a better measure of trends over time since it has adopted a consistent methodology and is unaffected by changes in reporting or recording practices.

Example of statistics gathered by the Crime Survey for England and Wales

In 2003/04 the number of robbery offences in England and Wales, for people aged 16 and over was around 283,000.

In 2004/05 the number of robbery offences in England and Wales, for people aged 16 and over was around 255,000.

The survey does not measure robbery offences among victims under 16 years.

Data access
Data from the Crime Survey for England and Wales can be downloaded for research and teaching use via the UK Data Service website. Datasets since 1982 are available under a standard End User Licence; in addition, certain data from the Crime Survey (1996 to present) are subject to more restrictive Special Licence or Secure Access conditions than the main survey. There are also bespoke versions of the survey data available for teaching purposes.

Criticism

Professor Ken Pease, former acting head of the Home Office's police research group, and Professor Graham Farrell of Loughborough University, estimated in 2007 that the survey was underreporting crime by about 3 million incidents per year due to its practice of arbitrarily capping the number of repeated incidents that could be reported in a given year at five.  If true the error means that violent crime might actually stand at 4.4 million incidents per year, an 82% increase over the 2.4 million previously thought. Since the five crimes per person cap has been consistent since the BCS began this might not affect the long-term trends, however it takes little account of crimes such as domestic violence, figures for which would allegedly be 140% higher without the cap.  The ONS responded by explaining that because victims of ongoing abuse often are unable to recall the detail and number of specific incidents it makes sense to record this crime as a series of repeat victimisation.  These are only recorded in this manner if the incidents described were ‘the same thing, done under the same circumstances and probably by the same people’.

The methodology was subsequently changed after consultation in 2016, resulting in the first results without the cap in early 2019. This removed the limit, and also recorded "[r]epeat victimisation [...] defined as the same thing, done under the same circumstances, probably by the same people, against the same victim". The resulting change did not affect overall trends, or significantly increase the estimates except in violent offences which saw increases between 6% and 31%.

Lord de Mauley has said the BCS omits rape, assault, drug offences, fraud, forgery, crime against businesses and murder, while accepting that it "is accepted as a gold standard by most British academics and internationally".

One criticism is that both the youth survey and the adult surveys do not distinguish between a) crimes not reported to the police because they thought the police would do nothing or b) crimes not reported to the police because the victim thought them too trivial.

See also 
Crime in the United Kingdom
Policing in the United Kingdom
British Social Attitudes Survey
Social Trends (UK)

General:
Crime statistics
Criminology
Dark figure of crime
Self report study
International Crime Victims Survey
Victim study

References

Further reading 
 Stephen Moore, Investigating crime and deviance, 
 Van Dijk, J.J.M., van Kesteren, J.N. & Smit, P. (2008). Criminal Victimisation in International Perspective, Key findings from the 2004-2005 ICVS and EU ICS. The Hague, Boom Legal Publishers 2008 accessed at  May 7, 2008
 Van Dijk, J.J.M., Manchin, R., van Kesteren, J.N. & Hideg, G. (2005) The Burden of Crime in the EU. Research Report: A Comparative Analysis of the European Crime and Safety Survey (EU ICS) 2005 accessed at  April 3, 2007

External links
Crime in England and Wales - summaries and publications, Office for National Statistics
Access to survey data and resources, UK Data Service

Crime statistics
Law enforcement in England and Wales
1982 establishments in the United Kingdom